William Douglass Forsyth  (19093 March 1993) was an Australian public servant and diplomat. Over the course of his tenure, he was noted for his work both within the United Nations, and in promoting Southern Pacific countries internationally. In 1959, Forsyth was appointed Australian Ambassador to Vietnam, a role which he served in until 1961. During his appointment, he was also appointed Minister to Laos.

Forsyth died on 3 March 1993, aged 84, in Canberra.

Early life 
Forsyth was born in Casterton, Victoria where he spent his childhood. He attended Ballarat High School, and after graduation obtained his degree in political science and history.

References

Further reading

 'Forsyth, William Douglass (1909–1993)', Obituaries Australia, National Centre of Biography, Australian National University, http://oa.anu.edu.au/obituary/forsyth-william-douglass-27737/text35938
 William Douglas Forsyth, The Myth of Open Spaces: Australian, British and World Trends of Population and Migration, MUP/OUP, Melbourne/London, 1942.
 Chad J. Mitcham, 'Forsyth, William Douglass (1909–1993)', Australian Dictionary of Biography, National Centre of Biography, Australian National University, http://adb.anu.edu.au/biography/forsyth-william-douglass-27737/text35421, published online 2018.
 National Library of Australia, MS 5700: 'Papers of William Douglass Forsyth, 1875–1993'.
 'Obituary: WILLIAM DOUGLASS FORSYTH, OBE', The Canberra Times, 8 March 1993, p. 12, https://trove.nla.gov.au/newspaper/article/127200531.
 South Pacific Commission. Meeting House of the Pacific: The Story of the SPC, 1947–2007, Nouméa, New Caledonia: SPC Secretariat, 2007.

1909 births
1993 deaths
Ambassadors of Australia to Laos
Ambassadors of Australia to Vietnam
Ambassadors of Australia to Lebanon
Permanent Representatives of Australia to the United Nations
Australian Officers of the Order of the British Empire
University of Melbourne alumni
People from Casterton, Victoria